Landscape with the Flight into Egypt is a c. 1515 panel painting by Joachim Patinir, now in the Royal Museum of Fine Arts, Antwerp.

References

Paintings in the collection of the Royal Museum of Fine Arts Antwerp
1510s paintings
Patinir
Paintings by Joachim Patinir
Donkeys in art